Stereotoceras is a Middle and Upper Devonian genus in the oncocerid family Brevicoceratidae that formed a smooth, depressed, gyroconic shell with the dorsum much flatter that the venter.  Sutures are straight ventrally but have dorsal lobes.  Growth lines outline a ventral hyponomic sinus but are otherwise transverse.  The siphuncle in ventral, nummuloidal, with discrete, irregular, actinosiphonate deposits at the septal foramina.

References
Sweet. W. C. 1964.  Nautiloidea-Oncocerida; Treatise on Invertebrate Paleontology,  Part K. Geol Soc of America and Univ Kansas press, R.C. Moore (Ed)

Oncocerida
Middle Devonian first appearances
Late Devonian animals
Late Devonian genus extinctions